Frederick Blackburn may refer to:

Fred Blackburn (1902–1990), British Labour politician, Member of Parliament for Stalybridge and Hyde 1951–1970
Fred Blackburn (footballer) (1878–1951), English association footballer who played for Blackburn Rovers and West Ham United
Frédéric Blackburn (born 1972), Canadian double-olympic silver medalist (1992) in short track speed skating